Harihar Rao Sonule  was an Indian politician. He was elected to the Lok Sabha, the lower house of the Parliament of India as a member of the Scheduled Castes Federation.

References

External links
Official biographical sketch in Parliament of India website

India MPs 1957–1962
Lok Sabha members from Maharashtra
1927 births
Scheduled Castes Federation politician